Schumm is a surname. Notable people with the surname include:

Caroline Zoe Schumm (born 1988), American fashion designer
 Hans Schumm (1896–1990), German-born American Hollywood character actor
Harry Schumm (1877–1953), American actor
Herb Schumm (born 1942), Canadian football player
Howie Schumm (1940–2015), Canadian football player
Karl Schumm (1899-?), German diver
Trevor Schumm, Australian curler
Walter Schumm (born 1951), American academic